Antonio Novasconi (1798–1867) was an Italian prelate who became bishop of Cremona.

Life
Novasconi was born in Castiglione d'Adda, part of Cisalpine Republic. In 1810, he entered the minor seminary of Lodi and was ordained priest in 1821. His first duty as priest was as a professor in the Lodi seminary, and in 1831 he was named pastor of the parish of Maleo and transferred to Lodi in 1838. After the failed revolution of 1848–1849, he begged for mercy for the Italian patriots sentenced to death by the Austrians. In 1850, Pope Pius IX named him bishop of Cremona; during his episcopacy, he was one of the few bishops who supported Italian Unification. During the Second Italian War of Independence, he wrote a letter to the priests in his diocese where he repeated his support for Italian Unification; this opinion was unpopular in Italian Catholic circles because Pope Pius IX supported the church's right to have a state. King Victor Emmanuel II named him senator. He died in Cremona on 12 December 1867.

References 

1798 births
1867 deaths
People from the Province of Lodi
19th-century Italian Roman Catholic bishops
Members of the Senate of the Kingdom of Italy
Bishops of Cremona